Kébémer is a town with commune status in Louga Region in north-west Senegal, lying midway between Thiès and Saint-Louis. It is the chief settlement, with a population of nearly 20,000 in 2013, of the department of the same name.

History
The town was founded in 1774 by a Marabout family.

Notable residents
Abdoulaye Wade, President of Sénégal 2000-12, was born in Kébémer in 1926.
Gorgui Dieng, basketball player, was born in Kébémer in 1990.

References

Populated places in Louga Region
Communes of Senegal